The Ezhava are a prominent  community in kerala making up approximately 25% of the state's population. The following is a list of notable members of the Ezhava community.

Dynasty

 Mannanar

Legendary characters
Cheerappanchira Panicker - Martial ( Kalary) Guru of Swamy Ayyappan, Father of Malikappurathamma- 13/ 14 century.
Itty Achudan vaidyar - famous physician 
Aromal Chekavar
Unniyarcha

Spiritual leaders
Narayana Guru (1855- 1928) 
Malayala Swamy (1885-1962) - Spiritual leader in Andra Pradesh, Founder of Sri Vyasasramam in YERPED, born in Guruvayur, disciple of Sivalinga Dasa Swamikal
Vagbhatananda (1885-1939) - Founder of Atmavidya Sangam
Nataraja Guru (1895- 1973) - Founder of Narayana Gurukulam, Varkala, son of Dr. Padmanabhan Palpu
Karunakara Guru (1927-1999) is known as Navajyothi Karaunakara Guru, founder of Santhigiri Asramam.
Nitya Chaitanya Yati (1924-1999) - guru, philosopher

Literature
Kumaran Asan (1873 - 2924) – also known as Mahakavi Kumaran Asan
Muloor S. Padmanabha Panicker (1869-1931) – poet and prominent social reformer
C. V. Kunhiraman (1871-1949) – founder of Kerala Kaumudi, writer and journalist
S. K. Pottekkatt (1913-1982) - Recipient of Jnajpith Award (ജ്ഞാനപീഠം അവാര്‍ഡ്), novelist,
Sukumar Azhikode (1926-2012) - Recipient of Kendra Sahithya Academy Award, writer, philosopher, Sanskrit scholar, critic and orator
O. V. Vijayan (1930-2005) - Indian author (Khasakkinte Itihasam) and cartoonist

Politics

Chief Ministers
C. Kesavan - former Chief Minister of Travancore-Cochin
R. Sankar - former Chief Minister of Kerala.
V.S. Achuthanandan - former Chief Minister of Kerala. 
Pinarayi Vijayan - incumbent Chief Minister of Kerala.

Political Leaders
A. P. Udhayabhanu - former KPCC President, freedom fighter, writer, editor - Congress party selected him as the Chief Minister of Kerala, but he declined. 
Vayalar Ravi - former AICC Gen. Secretary, CWC member, Union Cabinet minister, former State Home minister, former KPCC president, founder of KSU, NSU and Youth Congress
K. R. Gowri Amma - Communist Party leader (CPM) leader, Minister in the first Kerala ministry in 1957.
Susheela Gopalan - Community Party leader and former minister
Veliyam Bhargavan - Communist Party leader (CPI) former state secretary
Pannyan Raveendran - CPI former state secretary. MP.
V. M. Sudheeran - former KPCC President, former Speaker, former state Minister'
Mullappally Ramachandran - KPCC President, former Union minister.
V. Muraleedharan - former BJP State President, Union minister
  K. Surendran - BJP State President

Social reformers
Padmanabhan Palpu
Arattupuzha Velayudha Panicker, ne 'Mangalam Vazhunnor Velayudha Perumal' 
Ayyathan Gopalan - founder of Sugunavardhini movement, leader of Bhehmo Samaj
T. K. Madhavan
Sahodaran Ayyappan
Moorkoth Kumaran

Cinema
Thilakan - actor
Ratheesh - actor in late 1970s and 1980s.
Sreenivasan - actor
Devan (actor) - actor
Mukesh (actor) - actor
Harisree Ashokan - actor
Mala Aravindan - actor
Kuthiravattom Pappu - actor
Kunchan (actor) - actor
Edavela Babu - actor
Samvrutha Sunil
Nithya Das
Mamta Mohandas
Mythili
Namitha Pramod - Malayalam film actor.
Vijay Babu (actor, born 1976)
Vinay Forrt - actor
Sunny Wayne - actor
Sreenath Bhasi - actor
Ramu Kariat- film director.
I. V. Sasi - film director. Malayalam, Tamil and Hindi

References

Ezhava

Ezhavas